Corn Fed is an album released in 2006 by American country music artist Shannon Brown. Although she had recorded two major-label albums previously, Corn Fed was the only one to be physically released. The album's title track peaked at #47 on the Billboard Hot Country Songs charts in early 2006, while the second single ("Pearls") failed to chart.

John Rich of Big & Rich produced the album. He previously recorded the track "She Brings the Lightning Down" on his 1999 debut album Underneath the Same Moon. The track "Why" was also recorded by Jason Aldean on his 2005 self-titled debut album, from which it was released as a single in late 2005.

Track listing

Personnel
Brian Barnett – drums
Wyatt Beard – background vocals
Dennis Burnside – piano, Hammond organ, keyboard
Perry Coleman – background vocals
Wes Hightower – background vocals
Mike Johnson – Dobro, pedal steel guitar, lap steel guitar
Matt Pierson – bass guitar
Ethan Pilzer – bass guitar
John Rich – acoustic guitar, background vocals
Mike Rojas – piano, keyboards
Jason Sellers – background vocals
Adam Shoenfeld – electric guitar
Jonathan Yudkin – Dobro, fiddle, mandolin, violin, viola, cello

Chart performance

References

2006 debut albums
Shannon Brown (singer) albums
Warner Records albums
Albums produced by John Rich